Etuale Manusamoa Tuilagi (born 18 May 1991), known as Manu Tuilagi, is a rugby union player for Sale Sharks.

Born in Fogapoa, Samoa, Tuilagi has five elder brothers who played for Samoa. He qualified for England through residency, having moved there at the age of 12, and in 2014 became a British citizen.

He has won 43 caps between 2011 and 2020, including playing in the 2011 Rugby World Cup and starting in the 2019 Rugby World Cup Final. He played for the Lions on their 2013 tour to Australia, winning one cap. His usual position is centre.

Early life
Tuilagi was born on 18 May 1991 in Fogapoa, Samoa. He is the younger brother of Freddie, Henry, Alesana, Anitelea and Sanele Vavae Tuilagi, all of whom are Samoan internationals and also played for Leicester. He has another sibling, Julie, who is fa'afafine. He was named Manusamoa, after the name of the Samoan national team, Manu Samoa, because his brother Freddie was selected for Samoa at the World Cup in 1991, the year Manu was born.

He moved to the UK to join his brothers, and began playing youth rugby in 2004 with Rumney RFC while living in Cardiff, when his brother Freddie was playing for the Cardiff Blues. Aged 15, he moved back to Leicester, joining the Leicester Tigers academy.

In June 2010, Tuilagi faced possible deportation from the UK after it became known that he had entered the country on a holiday visa six years earlier and had stayed on illegally. After an appeal, he was later granted indefinite leave to remain. He and his brother Alesana are both Catholic.

Club career

Leicester Tigers
Tuilagi represented Leicester in the Middlesex Sevens at Twickenham in 2009.

On 6 November 2009, Tuilagi played for Leicester Tigers against  at Welford Road. Leicester won 22–17.

He began his first season, 2010–11, with the senior Tigers side. Tigers Director of Rugby Richard Cockerill said that he expected Tuilagi to be a first-team regular and to play for  before long. During this season he started the majority of games for Tigers and was called up for England Saxons duty. In Leicester's Premiership semi-final against Northampton Saints on 14 May 2011, Tuilagi received a yellow card for punching Chris Ashton. Tuilagi was later cited for this offence and given a 10-week ban, later reduced to five weeks.

Tuilagi started the 2013 Premiership final and scored a try as Leicester defeated Northampton Saints. 

After injuring his hamstring in late 2014, Manu did not play for the Tigers again until January 2016, making his comeback off the bench in the 30–27 East Midlands derby win over Northampton Saints. He played for the rest of the 2015/16 season. However, his injury problems continued and he was sidelined for most of the 2016/17 season with knee problems, making his comeback in the first game of the 2017/18, only to suffer a new injury to his other knee. In a bid to cure his injury problems Tuilagi visited a Samoan witch doctor in November 2017, the witch doctor claimed to have found three spirits had married Tuilagi and were causing the injuries, and massaged Tuilagi for two hours a day for four days to block the spirits. On 10 July 2020, Tuilagi left Leicester Tigers after failing to agree a reduced wage package, amid the financial challenges caused to the club by the coronavirus pandemic.

Sale Sharks
On 13 July 2020, Tuilagi agreed to join Sale Sharks on a one-year deal until the end of the 2020-21 season. He has since extended his contract for a further two seasons.

International career
He was selected to start the England Saxons game against Italy 'A' in January 2011, scoring a second-half try in a match which England won 45–17. In June 2011 he was named in England's training squad for the 2011 Rugby World Cup.

In addition, Tuilagi has been involved with the England Sevens squad. In May 2010 he played for an England seven which won the London Floodlit Sevens, playing under the name 'Dig Deep England'.

On 6 August 2011, he made his England début in the World Cup warm-up match against Wales at Twickenham. As one of the starting XV, he scored a try in the 44th minute underneath the posts after an inside pass from Jonny Wilkinson. He then played in the third warm-up game, a victory over Ireland, and scored again. He was a regular starter during the World Cup. One of his strongest international performances came in the final match of the 2012 Autumn internationals, against the World Cup winners New Zealand at Twickenham. England won 38–21 – their largest ever winning margin over the All Blacks. Tuilagi featured in all three of England's tries.

Tuilagi was named in the Lions squad for their 2013 tour to Australia. He played against Western Force, Queensland Reds and Melbourne Rebels, and also played in the third test against the Wallabies, when he came on as a substitute in the 69th minute.

Tuilagi returned to the England squad in March 2016 for the 2016 Six Nations Championship after not playing for the national side due to injury and disciplinary reasons since June 2014. He was ruled out of England's tour of Australia due to an injury suffered in a Premiership semifinal loss against Saracens.

Tuilagi returned to the England team in 2018 and came off the bench in a 37–18 win against  to win his 28th cap.

After a string of strong performances for club team Leicester Tigers, Tuilagi was included in the England squad for the 2019 Six Nations that ultimately finished in 2nd place, runners up to Grand Slam winners Wales.

International tries

Honours

Leicester Tigers
 Premiership Winner (2): 2010, 2013
 Anglo-Welsh Cup Winner (2): 2011-12, 2016-17

Sale Sharks
 Premiership Rugby Cup Winner: 2019-20

England
 Six Nations Winner (2): 2016, 2020
Triple Crown Winner (2): 2016, 2020
Millennium Trophy Winner (3) : 2012,2013,2020
Rugby World Cup Runner up: 2019

British & Irish Lions
British & Irish Lions series: 2013

Disciplinary issues
Tuilagi has been involved in a number of incidents that have affected his playing career. In 2011, he was banned for five weeks for repeatedly punching Chris Ashton in the Premiership semi-final between Leicester and Northampton.

During the 2011 World Cup, he was fined £4,800 after wearing a sponsored mouthguard, breaking the tournament's rules. In the aftermath of England's exit from the World Cup after losing to France, he was arrested by New Zealand police for jumping into Auckland harbour from a ferry, and was subsequently fined £3,000 by the RFU.

In September 2013, he issued an apology to Prime Minister David Cameron after making a "bunny ears" sign behind his back during a visit by the Lions squad to Downing Street.

In May 2015, Tuilagi was convicted of assaulting two female police officers and a taxi driver, and fined £6,205. England coach Stuart Lancaster subsequently announced that Tuilagi would not be considered for selection until January 2016, thus missing the 2015 World Cup.

In August 2017, after rejoining the England squad after a series of injuries, he returned to the team hotel drunk with teammate Denny Solomona, and they were sent home by coach Eddie Jones. Tuilagi was not selected in England's initial squad for the 2018 Six Nations.

In March 2020, Tuilagi was sent off in a Six Nations Championship match against Wales at Twickenham, which England won 33-30, after it was deemed by the Referee, Ben O'Keefe of New Zealand, that he had committed a no-arms tackle on the Welsh winger, George North. A disciplinary panel subsequently banned Tuilagi from playing for four weeks, but he did not subsequently miss any games, owing to the coronavirus lockdown.

On 18 February 2023, Tuilagi was red carded while playing for Sale Sharks against Northampton Saints in a Premiership Rugby match. In the 13th minute he was judged to have used his non-ball carrying elbow to target the throat of opposition player Tommy Freeman. He subsequently received a four week ban.

References

External links

1991 births
Living people
British & Irish Lions rugby union players from England
British & Irish Lions rugby union players from Samoa
England international rugby union players
English Roman Catholics
Leicester Tigers players
Rugby union centres
Samoan sportspeople
Samoan expatriates in England
Samoan Roman Catholics
Tuilagi family
Naturalised citizens of the United Kingdom
Samoan emigrants to the United Kingdom
Samoan expatriates in Wales